Barbara Mary Crampton Pym FRSL (2 June 1913 – 11 January 1980) was an English novelist. In the 1950s she published a series of social comedies, of which the best known are Excellent Women (1952) and A Glass of Blessings (1958). In 1977 her career was revived when the critic Lord David Cecil and the poet Philip Larkin both nominated her as the most under-rated writer of the century. Her novel Quartet in Autumn (1977) was nominated for the Booker Prize that year, and she was elected as a Fellow of the Royal Society of Literature.

Biography

Early life
Barbara Mary Crampton Pym was born on 2 June 1913 at 72 Willow Street in Oswestry, Shropshire, the elder daughter of Irena Spenser, née Thomas (1886–1945) and Frederic Crampton Pym (1879–1966), a solicitor. She was educated at Queen's Park School, a girls' school in Oswestry. From the age of 12, she attended Huyton College, near Liverpool. Pym's parents were active in the local Oswestry operatic society, and she was encouraged to write and be creative from a young age. She spent most of her childhood at Morda Lodge in Morda Road, Oswestry, where in 1922 she staged her first play, The Magic Diamond, performed by family and friends.

In 1931, she went to St Hilda's College, Oxford, to study English. While at Oxford, she developed a close friendship with the future novelist and literary critic Robert Liddell who would read her early works and provide key feedback In the 1930s, she travelled to Germany on several occasions, developing a love for the country as well as a romantic relationship with a young Nazi officer, Friedbert Gluck. Although she initially admired Hitler and did not foresee the advent of war, she later recognised her "blind spot", and removed a character based on Gluck from the novel she was in the process of writing.

In early 1939, Pym approached Jonathan Cape about a job in publishing; none was available at the time. The outbreak of World War II changed her plans, and in 1941 she went to work for the Censorship Department in Bristol, later joining the Women's Royal Naval Service. From 1943, she served in naval postal censorship, eventually being posted to Naples.

Personal life
In June 1946, Pym started work at the International African Institute in London. She was the assistant editor for the scholarly journal Africa, where she would work until her retirement in 1974. That inspired her use of anthropologists as characters in some of her novels, notably Excellent Women, Less than Angels, and An Unsuitable Attachment. Pym's sister Hilary separated from her husband in 1946, and the two sisters moved in together in a flat in Pimlico. They would later move to a house in Queen's Park.

Pym never married or had children, despite several close relationships with men. In her undergraduate days, they included Henry Harvey (a fellow Oxford student, who remained the love of her life), Rupert Gleadow, and the future politician Julian Amery. In 1942 she had a brief relationship with the BBC radio producer Gordon Glover, who was the estranged husband of her friend Honor Wyatt. Glover broke this off abruptly, which traumatised Pym, and, when Glover died in 1975, she burnt her diary for 1942.

Early literary career
Pym wrote her first novel, Some Tame Gazelle, in 1935, but it was rejected by numerous publishers including Jonathan Cape and Gollancz. She wrote another novel, Civil to Strangers in 1936 and several novellas in the following years, which were collectively published as Civil to Strangers after Pym's death. In 1940, Pym wrote the novel Crampton Hodnet, which would also be published after her death.

After some years of submitting stories to women's magazines, Pym heavily revised Some Tame Gazelle which this time was accepted by Jonathan Cape for publication in 1950. The poet Philip Larkin regarded Some Tame Gazelle as Pym's Pride and Prejudice. The novel follows the lives of two middle-aged spinster sisters in an English village before the War, who are both given the possibility of love. That year, Pym also had a radio play – Something to Remember – accepted by the BBC.

Pym's second novel, Excellent Women (1952) was well received, although her third, Jane and Prudence (1953) received more mixed reviews. Her fourth novel, Less than Angels (1955) had poorer sales than the previous three, but it attracted enough attention to be Pym's debut novel in the United States. A representative from Twentieth Century Fox came to England with an interest in securing the film rights, but this ultimately fell through.

Pym's fifth novel, A Glass of Blessings (1958) was poorly reviewed, with Pym noting that – of her first six novels – it was the worst reviewed. However the inclusion of sympathetic homosexual characters, in an era when homosexuality was largely frowned upon, attracted some interest in contemporary reviews, including The Daily Telegraph. Pym's sixth novel was No Fond Return of Love (1961), in which two female academic research assistants fall in love with the same man. All of Pym's books up to this point had featured either the Anglican church community or anthropologists; No Fond Return of Love combines the two. The book continued the trend of Pym's novels receiving minimal critical attention. Nonetheless, it was positively reviewed in Tatler, with the reviewer commenting:

"Wilderness years"
In 1963, Pym submitted her seventh novel – An Unsuitable Attachment – to Cape. Editor Tom Maschler, who had recently joined the firm, rejected the manuscript, on the advice of two readers. Pym wrote back to protest that she was being unfairly treated, but was told (sympathetically but firmly) that the novel did not show promise. Pym revised the manuscript and sent it to several other publishers, but with no success. Pym was advised that her style of writing was old-fashioned, and that the public were no longer interested in books about small-town spinsters and vicars. She was forced to consider finding a new authorial voice, but ultimately felt that she was too old to change to adapt to what publishers considered popular taste. Pym was told that the minimum 'economic figure' for book sales was 4,000 copies, whereas several of her books from the 1950s had not achieved that number.
 
As a result, Pym did not publish anything from 1962 until 1977. Regardless, she continued writing novels and short stories, and refining existing works, while she continued her professional career at the International African Institute. Pym never fully forgave Cape, or Tom Maschler. She and her sister invented a dessert called "Maschler pudding", which was a combination of lime jelly and milk. In 1965, she wrote in a letter, "I really still wonder if my books will ever be acceptable again". Pym wrote The Sweet Dove Died in 1968 and An Academic Question in 1970. She submitted Dove to several publishers but it was again rejected. However her earlier novels were reprinted during this era due to popular demand among local libraries. Pym wrote 27 short stories, of which only 6 were published during her lifetime. The remainder are stored in the Pym archives at the Bodleian Library.

In 1961, Pym began a letter-writing correspondence with Philip Larkin, as he was preparing to write a review article of one of her novels. They continued a constant series of letters for 19 years, right up until her death. They met for the first time in April 1975, at the Randolph Hotel, Oxford.

In 1971, Pym was diagnosed with breast cancer and underwent a mastectomy on her left breast. The operation was successful and she was deemed clear of cancer. In 1972, Pym and her sister Hilary purchased Barn Cottage at Finstock in Oxfordshire. The sisters played an active role in the social life of the village. Pym retired from her career in 1974. That year, she had a small stroke, which left her with temporary dyslexia. She continued to write, completing Quartet in Autumn in 1976, which was similarly rejected by Hamish Hamilton Limited. Although Pym was no longer being published, she found a job on the awards committee of the Romantic Novelists' Association.

Rediscovery and final years
On 21 January 1977, the Times Literary Supplement ran an article in which high-profile literary figures listed their most underrated and overrated British novelists of the century. Pym was chosen as the most underrated writer by both Larkin and Lord David Cecil, and was the only novelist to be selected by two contributors. On the strength of that review, literary interest in Pym was revived after 16 years. Pym and Larkin had kept up a private correspondence for 17 years, but even his influence had previously been of no use in getting her a new publishing contract. Several publishing companies expressed an interest, including her former publisher Cape. Pym rejected them in favour of Macmillan, who agreed to publish Quartet in Autumn the same year. Before Quartet had been published, Macmillan also agreed to publish The Sweet Dove Died, which she had reworked since completing it 10 years earlier. Cape reprinted her earlier novels, to which they still had the rights. The BBC interviewed Pym for a programme, Tea with Miss Pym, which aired on 21 October 1977. Reviews of Quartet were almost uniformly positive, and the novel was nominated for the 1977 Booker Prize. Pym attended the ceremony, but the award went to Paul Scott, for his book Staying On.

The rediscovery also meant Pym was noticed in the United States for the first time. E.P. Dutton secured the rights to all of her existing novels, commencing with Excellent Women and Quartet in Autumn, and published her entire oeuvre between 1978 and 1987. The discovery of Pym's novels, combined with the narrative of her "comeback", made her a minor success in the USA during that period. Following her return to the public eye, she was elected as a Fellow of the Royal Society of Literature. Pym was interviewed for an episode of Desert Island Discs on 1 August 1978, which was replayed on BBC Radio 4 Extra on 2 June 2013 – the centenary of her birth.

Pym's final novels have a more sombre, reflective tone than her earlier ones, which were in the high comedy tradition. By mid-1977, she had conceived an idea for her next novel, A Few Green Leaves, which would turn out to be her last. In January 1979, a lump in Pym's abdomen was diagnosed as malignant, a return of the breast cancer she had had in 1971. She underwent chemotherapy while completing the draft of A Few Green Leaves. Aware she did not have long to live, she attempted to complete the novel before her death. She had already considered the plot of another novel, which would follow two women from different social backgrounds, starting with their youth and moving through to maturity, including sequences set in World War II but she would never get to start work on it. By October 1979, Pym was confined to bed. Although not entirely satisfied with the final draft of A Few Green Leaves, she submitted it to Macmillan, and it was published it in 1980, shortly after her death.

On 11 January 1980, Barbara Pym died of breast cancer, aged 66. Following her death, her sister Hilary continued to champion her work, and was involved in setting up the Barbara Pym Society in 1993. Posthumously, Crampton Hodnet, An Academic Question and An Unsuitable Attachment were published, in conjunction with Pym's literary executor, the novelist Hazel Holt. Holt and Hilary Pym also published a collection, Civil to Strangers and Other Writings, which was a collection of short stories and novellas from Pym's early years. Holt and Hilary Pym published three additional volumes: A Very Private Eye, an "autobiography" comprising Pym's edited diaries and letters, A Lot To Ask: A Life of Barbara Pym, a biography written by Holt, and A la Pym, a cookbook comprising recipes for dishes featured throughout Pym's novels.

Hilary lived at Barn Cottage until her death in February 2004. The Pym sisters are buried in Finstock churchyard. In 2006, a blue plaque was placed on the cottage, marking it as an historic site.

Works and themes
Several strong themes link the works in the Pym canon, which are more notable for their style and characterisation than for their plots. A superficial reading gives the impression that they are sketches of village or suburban life, and comedies of manners, studying the social activities connected with the Anglican church, Anglo-Catholic parishes in particular. Pym attended several churches during her lifetime, including St Michael and All Angels Church, Barnes, where she served on the Parochial Church Council.

Pym closely examines many aspects of women's and men's relations, including unrequited feelings of women for men, based on her own experience. Pym was also one of the first popular novelists to write sympathetically about unambiguously gay characters, most notably in A Glass of Blessings. She portrayed the layers of community and figures in the church seen through church functions. The dialogue is often deeply ironic. A tragic undercurrent runs through some of the later novels, especially Quartet in Autumn and The Sweet Dove Died.

More recently, critics have noted the serious engagement with anthropology that Pym's novels depict. The seemingly naive narrator Mildred Lathbury (Excellent Women), for example, actually engages in a kind of participant-observer form that represents a reaction to the structural functionalism of the Learned Society's focus on kinship diagrams. Tim Watson links Pym's acute awareness of the social changes in the apparently cosy world of her novels to a critique of functionalism's emphasis on static social structures.

Pym's novels are known for their intertextuality. All of Pym's novels contain frequent references to English poetry and literature, from medieval poetry to much more recent work, including John Keats to Frances Greville.

Additionally, Pym's novels function as a shared universe, in which characters from one work can cross over into another. Usually the reappearances are in the form of brief cameos or mentions by other characters. For instance, the relationship between Mildred Lathbury and Everard Bone in Excellent Women is left unconfirmed at the end of that novel. However the characters are referenced or appear in Jane and Prudence, Less than Angels, and An Unsuitable Attachment, in which their marriage and happiness are confirmed. The character of Esther Clovis, a leading member of the anthropological community, appears in Excellent Women and two further novels, before her death; Esther's memorial service is then seen from the point of view of two different (unrelated) characters in An Academic Question and A Few Green Leaves. Esther Clovis is thought to have been inspired by Beatrice Wyatt, Pym's predecessor as assistant editor of Africa.

Popular culture and reputation
Forewords to her novels have been written by A. N. Wilson, Jilly Cooper and Alexander McCall Smith.

Philip Larkin said, "I'd sooner read a new Barbara Pym than a new Jane Austen". Shirley Hazzard was a fan of Pym's work, which she described as "penetrating, tender, and... greatly daring". The novelist Anne Tyler wrote about her work:

On 19 February 1992, the British television series Bookmark broadcast an episode entitled Miss Pym's Day Out, written and directed by James Runcie. The film follows Pym (played by Patricia Routledge) from dawn to evening on the day she attended the 1977 Booker Prize awards, for which Quartet in Autumn was nominated. The script includes excerpts from Pym's letters and diaries. Appearances by real life figures including Hilary Pym, Hazel Holt, Jilly Cooper, Tom Maschler and Penelope Lively are contrasted with adapted excerpts from Pym's novels performed by actors. The film was nominated for a BAFTA Huw Wheldon award for Best Arts Programme  and won the Royal Television Society award for Best Arts Programme.

Novels
Some Tame Gazelle (1950) 
Excellent Women (1952) 
Jane and Prudence (1953) 
Less than Angels (1955) 
A Glass of Blessings (1958) 
No Fond Return of Love (1961) 
Quartet in Autumn (1977) 
The Sweet Dove Died (1978) 
A Few Green Leaves (1980) 
An Unsuitable Attachment (written 1963; published posthumously, 1982) 
Crampton Hodnet (completed circa 1940, published posthumously, 1985) 
An Academic Question (written 1970–72; published posthumously, 1986)
Civil to Strangers (written 1936; published posthumously, 1987)

Biography and autobiography
Barbara Pym – A Very Private Eye: An Autobiography in Diaries and Letters, edited: Hazel Holt and Hilary Pym (1984)
Hilary Pym and Honor Wyatt – A la Pym: The Barbara Pym Cookery Book (1988)
Hazel Holt – A Lot To Ask: A Life of Barbara Pym (1990)
Yvonne Cocking – Barbara at the Bodleian: Revelations from the Pym Archives (2013)
Paula Byrne − The Adventures of Miss Barbara Pym, London : William Collins;  (2021)

References

Further reading
Hazel K Bell (ed.) – No Soft Incense: Barbara Pym and the Church (2004)
Orna Raz – Social Dimensions in the Novels of Barbara Pym, 1949–1962: the Writer as Hidden Observer (2007)

External links

The Barbara Pym Society based at St Hilda's College, Oxford.
Blue plaque to Barbara Pym on her Finstock home
Barbara Pym Desert Island Discs, BBC

1913 births
1980 deaths
People from Oswestry
Writers from Shropshire
Alumni of St Hilda's College, Oxford
Deaths from cancer in England
Deaths from breast cancer
English women novelists
20th-century English women writers
20th-century English novelists